Anders Lindh (2 October 1929 – 19 November 1996) was a Swedish gymnast. He competed in eight events at the 1952 Summer Olympics.

References

1929 births
1996 deaths
Swedish male artistic gymnasts
Olympic gymnasts of Sweden
Gymnasts at the 1952 Summer Olympics
Sportspeople from Örebro